Mosaic is a multi-site megachurch based in Los Angeles, California, and is currently led by Erwin McManus. The church had been affiliated with the Southern Baptist Convention, but today, it describes itself as non-denominational.

History 

Thirty-five charter members of Bethel Baptist Church began meeting on January 3, 1943, in a rented storefront in Los Angeles, California. Members brought their own chairs to the first service. By 1958, two more "missions" or services were established in Baldwin Park and Monterey Park.

In 1969, at age 24, Thomas A. Wolf "Brother Tom" became the senior pastor of the then-named First Southern Baptist Church of East Los Angeles. The small number of people still attending were predominantly Caucasian/Anglo and elderly in an area that was becoming more diverse with Hispanic, Armenian , and Asian families moving in as Caucasian/Anglo families moved to the suburbs. The churches' new make-up was approximately 50 percent Hispanic, 40 percent Caucasian or Anglo, and 10 percent Asian. Wolf created a leadership team that reflected this new cultural make-up with Hispanics filling over 50 percent of elder and leadership roles and Asian serving approximately 20 percent of these roles.

Located on Brady Ave, church members began to refer to the congregation as The Church on Brady. Although never officially changed, this name was how it became recognized.

Wolf taught the church a process called "Oikos Evangelism": reaching out to one's circle of influence; home church groups or "Share Groups". 

By 1983 the original building on Brady was far outgrown and in need of repair. Wolf led the church through a building phase that was completed in 1987. Brady faced a constant issue of overcrowding due to perennial growth. At this time Wolf developed a training program and "L.A. Tour" which pointed out the mosaic quality of diverse populations of Los Angeles, rather than the "melting pot" concept that many media sources used to describe the communities and ethnic areas of the city. This "mosaic" terminology later became central to the re-naming of the congregation from the Church on Brady many establishments and congregations were set up due to the organizations popularity.

In October 1991, Erwin McManus was first introduced to The Church on Brady as the keynote speaker at Brady's Spare Not Conference on World Evangelism. He was then invited to move to The Church on Brady and Los Angeles to transition into the role of Senior Pastor. Early in 1994, McManus officially became Senior Pastor.  Wolf then moved into the role of "Teaching Pastor" and simultaneously accepted a teaching position at Golden Gate Seminary in San Francisco.

McManus built on the foundation set at Brady, promoting the use of multi-media, art and dance in worship. Regular night-time services also began being offered.

A new name was sought with "MOSAIC" being the accepted choice.  It was at this time that the Sunday night service was moved to the Club Soho, a nightclub in downtown Los Angeles (relocating several years later to the Mayan Theater, also in downtown Los Angeles).  MOSAIC has since become a single church with multiple sites.

In 2006, Mosaic had approximately 60 nationalities with 2,000 in weekly attendance. Since then, Mosaic has expanded to 7 campuses along the Pacific Coast and has a weekly attendance of over 5,000.

Campuses 

Mosaic Hollywood launched in 2011 at the former Fifth Church of Christ, Scientist building. The 1959 structure located at the intersection of Hollywood Boulevard and La Brea Avenue has been designated a Los Angeles Historic-Cultural Monument.

Mosaic South Pasadena launched in 2017 in the historic Rialto Theatre, and as of 2019 has a 20-year lease to continue operating there. Since moving into the abandoned theatre, Mosaic has hosted several movie nights.

Mosaic Venice was launched in 2017. Mosaic Orange County and Mosaic Mexico City were launched in 2018. Mosaic Seattle was launched in 2019. Mosaic Ecuador was launched in 2020.

Media 

Mosaic has a worship band named Mosaic MSC, led by Worship Pastor Mariah McManus. The band has released three live albums and three extended plays.

The church also produces the Battle Ready podcast. Hosted by Erwin and Aaron McManus. One of the most viewed episodes of the podcast covers mental health and the hosts' struggles with stress and anxiety.

They also host McManus, which "covers the hottest, hardest topics and current events, bringing unique insight, scriptural wisdom, and clarity" on Trinity Broadcasting Network's TBN Inspire.

Social interaction 

Mosaic has advocated for refugees, both domestically in the United States and globally around the world. World Vision International, a Christian organization that works to overcome poverty and injustice, listed Mosaic's Lead Pastor, Erwin McManus, as one of the top 25 mission-minded church leaders. The list includes pastors and leaders who are, "missions focused, Kingdom-minded and passionate about caring for the poor and oppressed". On April 29, 2019, CCM Magazine released an article, mentioning Mosaic's involvement abroad.

Beliefs on the LGBT+ community 
On May 28, 2019, the online magazine Hypebeast published an article in which Emily Jensen wrote and quoted McManus as having a large gay attendance and being "for everybody". On June 25, 2019, the article was updated after several former members disputed McManus's comment. McManus responded with a statement describing the church's community as diverse. On July 13, 2019, Refinery29 published an article that described megachurches in general as being image-obsession and claiming to have "open doors" while also being unwelcoming  to LGBTQ+ members and the LGBTQ+ community. One former Mosaic attendee said that openly gay people were denied leadership positions because they were gay.

ChurchClarity.org rates the congregation as having a "non-clear/non-affirming" policy towards the inclusion of LGBTQ members in the church.

References

External links
 Mosaic Website
 Mosaic MSC Website

Christian organizations established in 1943
20th-century Baptist churches in the United States
Southern Baptist Convention churches